, featured in the Japanese folktale Jiraiya Gōketsu Monogatari (The Tale of the Gallant Jiraiya), is the archenemy of the ninja Jiraiya.  He was once named  and was one of Jiraiya's followers but was overtaken by serpent magic. Having changed his name to Orochimaru, he gained the ability to turn himself into a giant serpent. He poisoned Jiraiya and Tsunade the slug princess by pouring his venom on them as they slept, only for another follower to save the couple's lives afterwards. "The story, first recorded in 1806, was adapted into a mid-19th-century serialized novel (43 installments, 1839–1868) and a kabuki drama, based on the first 10 installments, by Kawatake Mokuami, in 1852. In the 20th-century, the story was adapted in several films, in video games, and in a manga."

Orochi means "big snake" or "serpent".
The legend of Orochimaru has modern day correlations. Legend suggests the "power of the white snake" can be found in the fabled Ryuchi cave which grants the user with extraordinary powers, such as immortality, face stealing, and shape shifting. Japanese folklore speaks of a similar snake-like humanoid that stalks the fields every harvest time demanding a portion of the farmers crops.

In modern days, the manga and anime franchise Naruto features the characters Jiraiya, Orochimaru and Tsunade where Orochimaru is portrayed to be the legendary ninja with the power of the snakes.

See also
 Susanoo
 Yamata no Orochi

References

External links

Fictional ninja
Japanese folklore
Legendary serpents

ro:Akatsuki#Orochimaru